Spurway is may refer to:

 Spurway, Oakford, an historic manor in Devon, England
 The Spurway family, of Riverview House, West Ryde, New South Wales, Australia

People with the surname
Edward Spurway (1863–1914), English cricketer 
Francis Spurway (1894–1980), English cricketer
Helen Spurway (c.1917–1978), British biologist 
Michael Spurway (1909–2007), British civil servant in the Colonial Service and later a businessman
Robert Spurway (1866–1898), English cricketer 
Sam Spurway (born 1987), English cricketer
Thomas Spurway, English Member of Parliament